"Alien" is a song recorded by American singer Sabrina Carpenter and British DJ and record producer Jonas Blue, taken from both the Japanese editions of Blue's debut album Blue and Carpenter's album Singular: Act I. The track was written by Carpenter, Janee Bennett and its producer Blue. The song was released by Hollywood Records on March 16, 2018. "Alien" describes what it is like to be lost in someone's feelings and how alienating it can be. The song reached number one on Billboards Dance Club Songs. It was accompanied by a music video directed by Carly Cusson premiered on her Vevo channel on March 29, 2018.

Background and recording
The idea for the song came about during a weekend meeting in London between the two artists. According to Sabrina, she describes what it’s like to be lost in someone’s feelings and how alienating that can be, hence the song's title.

Composition and lyrical interpretation
Musically, "Alien" is a two minutes and fifty-four seconds song. In terms of music notation, "Alien" was composed using  common time in the key of B flat minor, with a moderate tempo of 106 beats per minute. The song follows the chord progression of Gmaj7-A-Bm(add4)-Asus in the verses and Carpenter's vocal range spans from the low note A3 to the high note of D5, giving the song one octave and three notes of range.

Music videos
It was first released a vertical music video directed by Alexandra Gavillet through Spotify on March 16, 2018 and later on Vevo and YouTube on April 11, 2018. The music video was released through Vevo and YouTube on March 30, 2018 and was directed by Carly Cusson.

Track listing

Credits and personnel
Recording and management
Mastered at The Erchange Mike Marsh Mastering (Devon, England)
Seven Summits Music/Pink Mic Music, Universal Music Publishing Ltd, Universal Songs Of PolyGram Int., Inc.

Personnel

Sabrina Carpenter – lead vocals, songwriting
Janee Bennett – songwriting
Jonas Blue – songwriting, production, recording, mixing, arrangement, programming, vocals
Mike Marsh – vocals, mastering

Credits adapted from Blue (Japanese edition) liner notes.

Charts

Weekly charts

Year-end charts

Release history

References

 

2018 songs
2018 singles
Jonas Blue songs
Sabrina Carpenter songs
Hollywood Records singles
Songs written by Jonas Blue
Songs written by Jin Jin (musician)
Songs written by Sabrina Carpenter
Vertically-oriented music videos